Events from the year 1806 in the United Kingdom.

Incumbents
 Monarch – George III
 Prime Minister –  William Pitt the Younger (Tory) (until 23 January); William Grenville, 1st Baron Grenville (Coalition) (starting 11 February)
 Foreign Secretary – Henry Phipps, 1st Earl of Mulgrave (until 7 February) Charles James Fox (from 7 February) Charles Grey, Viscount Howick (from 24 September)
 Parliament – 2nd (until 24 October), 3rd (starting 13 December)

Events
 5 January – the body of Horatio Nelson, 1st Viscount Nelson, lies in state in the Painted Hall of Greenwich Hospital, London.
 8 January – Battle of Blaauwberg: British infantry force troops of the Batavian Republic in the Dutch Cape Colony to withdraw.
 9 January
 The Dutch commandant of Cape Town surrenders to British forces. On 10 January, formal capitulation is signed under the Treaty Tree in Papendorp (modern-day Woodstock).
 Lord Nelson is given a state funeral and interment at St Paul's Cathedral in London, attended by the Prince of Wales. 
 18 January – the Dutch Cape Colony capitulates to British forces, the origin of its status as a colony within the British Empire.
 23 January – William Pitt the Younger dies aged 46 at Bowling Green House on Putney Heath of a gastrointestinal tract complaint and is succeeded as wartime Prime Minister by his cousin Lord Grenville.
 6 February – Battle of San Domingo: The British Royal Navy gains a victory over the French off Santo Domingo.
 11 February – Ministry of All the Talents formed by Grenville.
 20 March – construction begins of Dartmoor Prison, to house prisoners of war.
 8 April – proceedings for the impeachment of Henry Dundas, 1st Viscount Melville (on the initiative of Samuel Whitbread) for the misappropriation of public money at the Admiralty begin; he will be acquitted in the last impeachment trial ever held in the House of Lords.
 4 July – Battle of Maida in Calabria: British forces defeat the French.
 7 July – start of the first Gentlemen v Players cricket match (discontinued in 1963).
 10 July – Vellore Mutiny, the first instance of a mutiny by the Indian sepoys against the British East India Company.
 23 July – British invasions of the River Plate: A British expeditionary force of 1,700 men lands on the left bank of the Río de la Plata and invades Buenos Aires.
 18 August – English seal hunter Abraham Bristow discovers the Auckland Islands.
 7 October – carbon paper patented by Ralph Wedgwood.
 20 October –  is wrecked in the Strait of Sicily with the loss of 347 of the 488 onboard.
 29 October to 17 December – a General election sees Grenville continue as Prime Minister.
 November – Napoleon declares a Continental Blockade against Britain.
 Supposedly secret 'Delicate Investigation' by senior statesmen into the life of Caroline of Brunswick, the Prince of Wales's estranged wife, finds "no foundation" for allegations against her morals.
 Annual British iron production reaches 260,000 tons.

Ongoing
 Anglo-Spanish War, 1796–1808
 Napoleonic Wars, 1803–1815

Publications
 A New System of Domestic Cookery, 1st edition, "by A Lady" (Maria Eliza Rundell) published in London by John Murray.
 Rhymes for the Nursery by sisters Jane and Ann Taylor published in London, including Jane's "The Star" ("Twinkle, Twinkle, Little Star").

Births
 1 February – Jane Williams (Ysgafell), writer (died 1885)
 6 March – Elizabeth Barrett Browning, poet (died 1861)
 9 April – Isambard Kingdom Brunel, engineer (died 1859)
 21 April – George Cornewall Lewis, statesman (died 1863)
 4 May – William Fothergill Cooke, inventor (died 1879)
 20 May – John Stuart Mill, philosopher (died 1873)
 27 June – Augustus De Morgan, mathematician, logician (died 1871)
 10 November – Alexander Milne, admiral (died 1896)
 11 December – William Prowting Roberts, Chartist lawyer (died 1871)

Deaths
 c. January?? – Mungo Park, Scottish explorer (born 1771)
 23 January – William Pitt the Younger, Prime Minister (born 1759)
 19 February – Elizabeth Carter, writer (born 1717)
 20 February – Lachlan McIntosh, Scottish-born American military and political leader (born 1725)
 17 March – David Dale, Scottish philanthropist (born 1739)
 23 March – George Pinto, composer (born 1785)
 24 May – John Campbell, 5th Duke of Argyll, Scottish field marshal (born 1723)
 10 July – George Stubbs, painter (born 1724)
 13 September – Charles James Fox, statesman (born 1749)
 22 October – Thomas Sheraton, furniture designer (born 1751)
 23 November – Roger Newdigate, politician (born 1719)
 29 December – Charles Lennox, 3rd Duke of Richmond, politician (born 1735)

See also
 1806 in Scotland

References

 
Years of the 19th century in the United Kingdom